Stott Pilates is a branded version of the Pilates method of physical exercise that was developed by Lindsay and Moira Merrithew.  The most significant difference between Stott Pilates and Joseph Pilates's original method of the early 1900s is that Stott Pilates focused on having a neutral spine posture and generated a different sequence of exercises.

History 
Moira had been a dancer with the Bermuda Ballet, and principal dancer with the City Ballet of Toronto and the Atlantic Ballet Company, but had to retire when she was 24 due to chronic foot injuries stemming from her having broken her foot as a child.  She was advised to explore Pilates by people at the Dancer Transition Resource Centre in Toronto, and she went to New York City to study with Romana Kryzanowska, a disciple of Joseph Pilates.  By that time she had met Lindsay Merrithew, who was working in New York at the time.  Lindsay received his business degree from Dalhousie University and then went on train as an actor at The Juilliard School in the drama department, Group 14.

In her own Pilates training and work, Moira found that there was not emphasis on establishing and strengthening a neutral spine posture, and also found that traditional Pilates didn't follow the sequence of exercises that had evolved in the field of dance, and she developed a version of Pilates that came to carry her maiden name as its brand.

The two of them moved back to Toronto in 1987, and in 1988 they opened a Pilates studio in their apartment and worked other jobs to make ends meet. Their business received a celebrity boost when Karen Kain, a principal dancer with the National Ballet of Canada started to take classes in their apartment; they managed to get the press to cover this, with Kain's help, and the business began to grow, allowing them to move to a studio. Lindsay had secured a small research grant from the National Research Council which allowed for their first patented aluminum Reformer to be built and tested for commercial use.  As the company developed, in general Moira handled the training and program development, and Lindsay developed their proprietary line of equipment and also handled the business matters along with the sales and marketing.

Training became an important element of the business model from the beginning, as they eventually had to train more instructors for the studio, and they eventually created a training and certification program. For an instructor or instructor trainer to maintain Stott Pilates certification, he or she must attend a minimum number of courses and workshops each year; thereby keeping current with the method.  Many Stott Pilates courses and workshops are part of the Continuing Education Credit (CEC) programme, and many of them are also recognized by outside organizations, including the American Council on Exercise (ACE).

In the mid-1990s, the company started to publish videos and DVDs of most of its programs, and in several languages. Publishing DVDs increased the awareness of the Stott Pilates method.

References

External links

 Official Website

Companies based in Toronto
Companies established in 1988
Pilates
Exercise organizations
Exercise-related trademarks